The initialism PVS may refer to:

Organization
 Polynesian Voyaging Society, a research and educational corporation in Hawaii
 Prisoner Visitation and Support, US non-profit organization
 Project Vote Smart, a US research organization
 PVS (projeto), a children project in Brazil
 Performance of Veterinary Services, an OIE capacity building platform for the sustainable improvement of national veterinary services
 Pojoaque Valley Schools

Science
 Persistent vegetative state
 Plummer–Vinson syndrome, a rare disease
 Polyvinyl siloxane, an addition reaction silicone elastomer
 Potato virus S, a plant pathogenic virus
 Phantom vibration syndrome
 Penile vibratory stimulation, a means of inducing erection and ejaculation

Technology
 Palmtex Portable Videogame System, a handheld videogame console
 Potentially visible set, a form of occlusion culling
 Principal variation search, a negamax algorithm
 Prototype Verification System, a specification language
 PVS-Studio, a static code analyzer for C, C++ and C#

Other
 The IATA code for Provideniya Bay Airport
 PVS News, a satirical news channel on the BBC's programme Broken News
 AN/PVS-14, monocular night vision device